Anton Morosani (20 June 1907 – 8 June 1993) was a Swiss ice hockey player who competed in the 1928 Winter Olympics.

He was a member of the Swiss ice hockey team, which won the bronze medal.

External links
profile

1907 births
1993 deaths
Ice hockey players at the 1928 Winter Olympics
Medalists at the 1928 Winter Olympics
Olympic bronze medalists for Switzerland
Olympic ice hockey players of Switzerland
Olympic medalists in ice hockey